Vesna Radović (born 7 September 1954 in Mostar) is a former Yugoslav/Austrian handball player who competed in the 1980 Summer Olympics and in the 1984 Summer Olympics.

In 1980 she won the silver medal with the Yugoslav team. She played three matches as goalkeeper.

Four years later she finished sixth with the Austrian team in the 1984 Olympic tournament. She played all five matches as goalkeeper.

References

1954 births
Living people
Yugoslav female handball players
Serbian female handball players
Austrian female handball players
Handball players at the 1980 Summer Olympics
Handball players at the 1984 Summer Olympics
Olympic handball players of Yugoslavia
Olympic handball players of Austria
Olympic silver medalists for Yugoslavia
Olympic medalists in handball
Medalists at the 1980 Summer Olympics